HMT Macbeth was a  naval trawler that served with the Royal Navy during the Second World War. She was built by the Goole Shipbuilding & Repairing Co. Ltd., Goole, United Kingdom. Macbeth was launched on 3 October 1940 and commissioned on 14 January 1941.

The crew comprised 4 officers and 36 ratings. Armament consisted of a 12-pounder anti-aircraft (AA) gun, three 20 mm Oerlikon AA guns and 30 depth charges.

Macbeth most notably participated in Operation Dervish in August 1941 as an escort vessel. During the war she was adopted by the Mildenhall Rural District Council, as part of Warship Week. One of the last two Shakespearian-class trawlers remaining in service with the Royal Navy, Macbeth was sold in 1947.

References

Publications
 Robert Gardiner (ed. dir.), Conway's All the World's Fighting Ships 1922–1946, p. 66. London: Conway Maritime Press, 1980.

External links
 Macbeth at Uboat.net
 MV Macbeth at WRECKSITE.eu

Shakespearian-class trawlers
Ships built in Goole
1940 ships
World War II patrol vessels of the United Kingdom